The Bormida di Spigno is a river of north-west Italy.

Geography 
There its waters run as the separate “Bormidas” of Mallare and Pallare in distinct close valleys before quickly joining after a few kilometers. It joins with the Bormida (or Bormida di Millesimo) near Bistagno in the Piedmontese province of Alessandria.

References 

Rivers of the Province of Savona
Rivers of the Province of Alessandria
Rivers of the Province of Asti
Rivers of Italy
Rivers of the Alps